Crusoe Bridge is a footbridge over the River Cam in Cambridge, England. It is the fourth bridge over the Cam in the city, and is the last footbridge on its upper upstream in Cambridge.
It connects Coe Fen with Sheep's Green, the wooden deck is on 4 steel piers. The bridge name is derived from the nearby 'Robinson Crusoe Island'.

See also
List of bridges in Cambridge
Template:River Cam map

References

Bridges in Cambridge
Bridges across the River Cam
Pedestrian bridges in England
Beam bridges in England